Charles Samuel Shapiro (born May 30, 1949) is an American diplomat (serving since 1977 in a variety of capacities, primarily relating to Latin America) and a former U.S. ambassador to Venezuela (2002 - 2004). He was President of the Institute of the Americas from October 2011 to July 2014, when Ambassador Shapiro was named the President of the World Affairs Council of Atlanta.

Education
Shapiro has degrees from the University of Pennsylvania (1971) and Georgia State University (1977), and served in the United States Coast Guard Reserve (1971–1977).

Career
His career includes assignments abroad, including Deputy Chief of Mission in Port of Spain, Trinidad and Tobago (1991-1994) and in Santiago, Chile (1995–1998). From 1983 to 1988, Shapiro worked on El Salvador, first as Desk Officer in Washington (1983–1985) and then as Political Counselor in San Salvador (1985–1988).

In Washington, Shapiro has served in a number of capacities in the US State Department's Bureau of Western Hemisphere Affairs (called the Bureau of Inter-American Affairs until 2000): Deputy Director in the Office of Andean Affairs (1988–1990); Executive Assistant to the Assistant Secretary of State for Western Hemisphere Affairs (1994–1995); Coordinator for Cuban Affairs (1999–2001); Principal Deputy Assistant Secretary (2005–2007); head of the Western Hemisphere Trade Task Force (2007–2009); and Senior Coordinator for Economic Initiatives. Other assignments include "Division Chief for South America" in the Bureau for International Narcotics and Law Enforcement Affairs (then called the Bureau of International Narcotics Matters), 1990–1991.

Ambassador to Venezuela
Shapiro served as U.S. ambassador to Venezuela from 19 March 2002 to 21 August 2004. Weeks before the 2002 Venezuelan coup d'état attempt against Hugo Chávez and only days after assuming his position, Shapiro met with a Venezuelan trade union organization that openly pursued involvement in the coup, with the ambassador stating that the United States would not assist with the plot and only supported a change of government by democratic means. Shapiro was accused of participating in the coup, with some stating that a meeting with interim president Pedro Carmona Estanga one day after the coup. Shapiro and other U.S. sources have denied this and claim that he urged Carmona to reinstitute the dissolved National Assembly.

Awards and recognition

See also 
Shapiro (family name)
United States-Venezuela relations

Notes

External links
Remarks of Colin L. Powell at the Swearing-In of Shapiro as Ambassador to Venezuela

Living people
Ambassadors of the United States to Venezuela
1949 births
University of Pennsylvania alumni
Georgia State University alumni